February 21 - Eastern Orthodox liturgical calendar - February 23

All fixed commemorations below are observed on March 7 (March 6 on leap years) by Eastern Orthodox Churches on the Old Calendar.

For February 22nd, Orthodox Churches on the Old Calendar commemorate the Saints listed on February 9.

Saints

 Saint Abilius (Avilius), Bishop of Alexandria (98)
 Saint Telesphorus, Pope of Rome (136)
 Saint Papias, Bishop of Hierapolis (2nd century)
 Martyr Synesius (Synetus), by the sword.
 Martyrs Maurice, his son Photinus, Theodore, Philip, and 70 soldiers, at Apamea in Syria (286-305)  (see also: December 27)
 Martyrs Anthusa and her 12 servants, by the sword.
 Saint Titus of Bostra, Bishop of Bostra in Arabia (378)
 Saint Ariston the Wonderworker, Bishop of Arsinoe, Cyprus (Famagusta) (c. late 4th - early 5th centuries)
 Venerable Baradates, hermit near Antioch (469)
 Venerable Saints Thalassius and Limneus hermits near Cyrrhus (5th century)
 Holy Nine Children of Kola, Georgia (6th century):
 Guram, Adarnasе, Baqar, Vache, Bardzim, Dachi, Dzhuansher, Ramaz, and Parsman.
 Saint Leontius of Lycia (6th century)
 Saints Babylus and his wife Comnita, of Nicosa (7th century)
 Venerable Athanasius the Confessor of Constantinople (821)
 Saint Peter the Stylite of Mount Athos.
 Saint Blaise, Bishop.

Pre-Schism Western saints

 Saint Paschasius, eleventh Bishop of Vienne in France (c. 312)
 Saint Maximianus of Ravenna, Bishop of Ravenna (c. 556)  (see also: February 21)
 Saint Elwin (Elwen), missionary, a holy man who accompanied St Breaca from Ireland to Cornwall (6th century)
 Saint John the Saxon, born in Saxony in Germany, he restored monasticism in England after the Danish attacks, Abbot of Athelney (895)
 Saint Raynerius (Raynier), a monk at Beaulieu near Limoges, France (c. 967)

Post-Schism Orthodox saints

 Saint Herman, founder of Stolobny Monastery, Novgorod (1614)

New martyrs and confessors

 New Hieromartyr Michael Lisitsyn, priest, of Ust-Labinskaya (1918)
 New Hieromartyrs Joseph Smirnov, Protopresbyter, and Vladimir Ilinsky, Priest (1918)
 New Hieromartyrs John Kastorsky, Deacon, and John Perebaskin, of Kostroma-Galich (1918)
 New Martyr Blessed Theoktista Mikhailovna, Fool-for-Christ, of Voronezh (1936)
 New Hieromartyrs Michael Gorbunov, John Orlov, Victor Morigerovsky, John Parushnikov, Sergius Belokurov, Andrew Yasenev, and Paul Smirnov, Priests (1938) 
 New Hieromartyrs Sergius Bukashkin and Antipas Kirillov, Hieromonks (1938)
 Virgin-martyrs Elizabeth Timokhin, Irene Smirnov, and Barbara Losev (1938)
 Virgin-martyr Parasceva Makarov (1938) 
 Martyrs Stephen Frantov and Nicholas Nekrasov (1938) 
 Martyrs Leonid Salkov and Peter Antonov, of Alma-Ata (1938)
 Martyr Andrew Gnevishev of Tver (1941)
 New Hieromartyr Philaret (Pryakhin), Abbot, of Trubino, Tver (1942)

Other commemorations

 Uncovering of the relics (607-610) of the Holy Apostles Andronicus and Junia (1st century) and the Holy Martyrs, at the Gate of Eugenius at Constantinople.
 Repose of Righteous Gregory (“Golden Grits”) Miroshnikov of Sednev (1855)
 Repose of Schemanun Avramia of Kashin (1855)
 Repose of Blessed Theoktista Mikhailovna, Fool-for-Christ, of Voronezh (1936)

Icon gallery

Notes

References

Sources
 February 22 / March 7. Orthodox Calendar (Pravoslavie.ru).
 March 7 / February 22. Holy Trinity Russian Orthodox Church (A parish of the Patriarchate of Moscow).
 February 22. OCA - The Lives of the Saints.
 The Autonomous Orthodox Metropolia of Western Europe and the Americas. St. Hilarion Calendar of Saints for the year of our Lord 2004. St. Hilarion Press (Austin, TX). p. 17.
 The Twenty-Second Day of the Month of February. Orthodoxy in China.
 February 22. Latin Saints of the Orthodox Patriarchate of Rome.
 The Roman Martyrology. Transl. by the Archbishop of Baltimore. Last Edition, According to the Copy Printed at Rome in 1914. Revised Edition, with the Imprimatur of His Eminence Cardinal Gibbons. Baltimore: John Murphy Company, 1916. p. 55.
 Rev. Richard Stanton. A Menology of England and Wales, or, Brief Memorials of the Ancient British and English Saints Arranged According to the Calendar, Together with the Martyrs of the 16th and 17th Centuries. London: Burns & Oates, 1892. p. 81.
Greek Sources
 Great Synaxaristes:  22 Φεβρουαρίου. Μεγασ Συναξαριστησ.
  Συναξαριστής. 22 Φεβρουαρίου. Ecclesia.gr. (H Εκκλησια τησ Ελλαδοσ). 
Russian Sources
  7 марта (22 февраля). Православная Энциклопедия под редакцией Патриарха Московского и всея Руси Кирилла (электронная версия). (Orthodox Encyclopedia - Pravenc.ru).
  22 февраля (ст.ст.) 7 марта 2014 (нов. ст.). Русская Православная Церковь Отдел внешних церковных связей. (DECR).

February in the Eastern Orthodox calendar